The 2022–23 Red Star Belgrade season will be the club's 17th in the Serbian SuperLiga and 77th consecutive season in the top flight of Yugoslav and Serbian football. The club will participate in the Serbian SuperLiga, Serbian Cup, UEFA Europa League and qualifications for UEFA Champions League.

Summary

Pre-season 
The first signing for this season was Zambian international midfielder Kings Kangwa who came in from Russian side Arsenal Tula where he spent last two and a half seasons. Kangwa signed four-year contract on 29 May 2022.

Strahinja Eraković, who played for the club in the last two seasons and is a product of the club's youth academy, received his first international call up for Serbia for four games of 2022–23 UEFA Nations League in June. He made his debut on 2 June coming on as a substitute in a 0–1 loss against Norway in Belgrade.

Two international players received call ups to play for their national teams in 2023 Africa Cup of Nations qualification games - El Fardou Ben Nabouhane for Comoros and Kings Kangwa for Zambia.

Milan Borjan received call up for Canada for the Friendly and 2022–23 CONCACAF Nations League A matches against Panama, Curaçao and Honduras.

Miloš Gordić and Petar Stanić both received call ups for the Serbia U21 squad for a 2023 UEFA European Under-21 Championship qualification games against France and Faroe Islands.

Three first squad players (Andrej Đurić, Nikola Stanković and Nemanja Motika) as well as six players who are on the loan from the club received call ups for Serbia U19 squad to play in 2022 UEFA European Under-19 Championship Elite round qualification matches against Netherlands, Ukraine and Norway. All three first squad players later received call ups for 2022 UEFA European Under-19 Championship.

On 10 June club announced that they appointed club's former midfielder Marko Marin as Chief of scouting department. Marin, who played for the Red Star between 2018 and 2020, is a former German international footballer who retired from professional football this summer.

On 11 June club signed new contract with Serbian defender Radovan Pankov. Pankov, who arrived at the club in 2019 from Radnički Niš, extended his contract with the club until summer of 2024.

On 13 June club signed new contract with another Serbian defender Marko Gobeljić. Gobeljić, who arrived at the club in 2017 from Napredak Kruševac, extended his contract with the club until summer of 2024. On the same day club started their pre-season with medical checks on their home ground in Belgrade. Training camp will move to Zlatibor between 13 and 19 June 2022 and after that to Slovenia between 22 June and 3 July 2022.

On 17 June Serbian defender Milan Gajić left the club on a free transfer in order to join Russian powerhouse CSKA Moscow. Gajić spent last four seasons with the Red Star winning four league titles and two cups.

On 21 June club announced their second signing for this season - Ghanaian international winger Osman Bukari. Bukari arrived from Belgian side Gent for an estimated fee of around €2,000,000 and will be staying with the club until summer of 2026.

July 
Red Star started their season in Serbian SuperLiga with a 4–0 home win against Radnički Niš in which five players made their debuts for the team. Kangwa and Bukari, who both arrived in the club during this season's summer transfer window, were both starters in this game and they managed to score one goal each. In the second half Leković, Lučić and Mustapha, who were all promoted from the youth squad at the start of this season, also made their debuts after they came in as a substitutes. In a third round 2–1 win against Mladost Lučani another two arrivals made their debut for the team. Both Stefan Mitrović and Aleksandar Pešić came in as a subs in the second half with Mitrović also scoring one goal. Lastly, in fourth round 6–0 win against Radnik Nemanja Milunović made his debut just a day after arriving at the club. In total Red Star played four league games during the July, winning all four of them and finishing at the top of the league by the end of the month.

On 13 July three more players from previous season left the club. Contracts were terminated with Italian defender Cristiano Piccini who arrived at the Red Star just six months prior and with French midfielder Axel Bakayoko who was part of the team for year and a half. Additionally, Serbian midfielder Petar Stanić also left the club on a six-month loan to the Serbian side Spartak Subotica.

On 18 July the club announced a new signing, Serbian under–21 international midfielder Stefan Mitrović who arrived from the Radnički Niš for a fee reported at €500,000. He signed four-years-long contract until summer of 2026.

On 20 July Red Star brought back Serbian striker Aleksandar Pešić. He arrived from Turkish side Fatih Karagümrük for an estimated fee of €800,000 and signed three-years-long contract until summer of 2025. Previously he played for the Red Star during the 2017–18 season during which he was league top scorer and won Serbian SuperLiga Player of the season award.

On 22 July Dutch forward Richairo Živković left the club on a free transfer after one season in which he played 14 games for the club and scored one goal. He later joined Dutch side Emmen.

On 27 July Canadian international goalkeeper and club's captain Milan Borjan extended his contract until summer of 2026. He joined the club in 2017 and won five consecutive Serbian SuperLiga titles and two Serbian Cup titles since then.

On 28 July another former player returned to the Red Star - Serbian defender Nemanja Milunović rejoined the club after spending one season at Turkish side Alanyaspor. Milunović signed two-years contract with the club.

August 
Red Star started this season's European spell in third qualification round of the 2022–23 UEFA Champions League. Draw for this round was held on 18 July and it was determined that the club will play Armenian champions Pyunik who eliminated Luxembourgian champions F91 Dudelange in the previous round. It was the first time that Red Star played an official match against them. Red Star won 7–0 on aggregate. Winner of this pairing was drawn to play in a play-off round against Israeli champion Maccabi Haifa who previously eliminated Cypriot champions Apollon Limassol. This was the first time in the club's history that they played against a team from Israel. Maccabi Haifa managed to secure qualification to group stage after a 5–4 aggregate win and Red Star was transferred to the Europa League Group stage. This will be fourth time in club's history that they will play in the Europa League. On a draw held on 26 August club was drawn into Group H together with French side Monaco, Hungarian champions Ferencvárosi and Turkish champions Trabzonspor. This will be the first time in club's history that they will play against Monaco and Trabzonspor.

In Serbian SuperLiga Red Star played three matches, winning two and drawing in Eternal derby against their arch-rivals Partizan. Club had two more games scheduled for this month, but they were postponed due to club's European games. At the end of the month Red Star was at the top of the league, one point ahead of second placed Novi Pazar.

On 7 August club announced the transfer of a Georgian international defender Irakli Azarovi. The young full-back arrived from Georgian champions Dinamo Batumi for an estimated fee of €300,000 and signed a four-year-long contract. He will be the first player from Georgia to play for Red Star.

On 11 August Russian midfielder Yegor Prutsev joined the club from Russian side Sochi. He signed a four-year-long contract.

On 12 August the club announced that it has extended the contract with Serbian international defender Strahinja Eraković until the summer of 2026. Eraković, who is a product of the club's youth academy, is a part of the club since 2020.

On 26 August, following club's elimination from Champions league Dejan Stanković, who was a head coach for three seasons, resigned from his position after winning three titles and two cups with them. He was succeeded by Miloš Milojević who previously worked as an assistant manager under Stanković between 2019 and 2021 after which he was appointed as a head coach of Swedish clubs Hammarby in 2021 with whom he won Svenska Cupen and Malmö in 2022.

On 28 August Serbian forward Milan Pavkov left the club to join the Saudi side Al-Fayha for an estimated fee of €1,000,000. Pavkov joined the club in 2017 and won four league titles and two cup titles during his tenure, playing 152 games and scoring 59 goals in the process.

On 29 August Malian international forward Kalifa Coulibaly joined the club on a free transfer, previously having played for a French side Nantes. He signed a one-year contract, with an option for the extension for another year. Coulibaly will be the first Malian player to ever play for the club. He made a debut for the club coming in as a substitute in Eternal derby against Partizan on 31 August.

On 30 August another forward left the club. Norwegian international Ohi Omoijuanfo moved to Danish side Brøndby for an estimated fee of €1,350,000. He arrived at the club at the start of this year and managed to score 24 caps and 12 goals, winning the double.

September 
During the September club played three games in Serbian SuperLiga, winning two and drawing one. This extended their unbeaten spell to ten games since the start of the season. At the end of the month club was at the top of the table, one point ahead of second placed Čukarički.

Club also started their Europa League group stage. First two games were played against Monaco at home and an away game against Trabzonspor. Both of them were defeats, which brought the club to the bottom of the group table at the end of September.

Draw for the first round of Serbian Cup was held on 19 September. Red Star were drawn to play an away game against Mačva Šabac in a game that was played on 29 September. Red Star won 2–0 and qualified for the second round of the competition.

On 15 September, on the closing day of the transfer market, club announced the signing of a Serbian midfielder Srđan Mijailović from Čukarički. This will be Mijailović's second spell at the club. He arrived for an undisclosed fee, and signed three-years-long contract.

October 
During the October club played six games in Serbian SuperLiga, winning all six of them. This extended their unbeaten spell to sixteen games since the start of the season. At the end of the month club was at the top of the table. 

In Europa League group stage club played three games, winning against Ferencváros and Trabzonspor at home and losing to Ferencváros in an away game. 

On 10 October club announced signing of a new three-years-long contract with Gabonese midfielder Guélor Kanga until summer of 2025.

On 11 October club returned Serbian youngster Jovan Mijatović from his loan spell at Grafičar Beograd. Mijatović, product of the club's youth academy, was loaned at Grafičar since June of this year during which he had 8 appearances and 5 goals for the senior squad.

On 19 October club announced another contract extension. Serbian midfielder Veljko Nikolić signed new three-years-long contract until summer of 2025.

On 26 October club announced first signing for a winter transfer window. Serbian full-back Lazar Nikolić joined the Red Star from Javor and signed contract until summer of 2025.

November 
During the November club played last 3 games in the first half of Serbian SuperLiga. They won all three of them, extending their winning spell to eleven games and their unbeaten spell to nineteenth games since the start of the season. That secured them first position with ten points lead against second placed Partizan.

In Europa League club played their last group stage match against Monaco, which they lost 3–1. With that game they finished last in the group and were eliminated from this seasons European competitions.

In Serbin Cup club was drawn to play against Radnički Sremska Mitrovica in round of 16. 

Three players were called-up to represent their national teams on 2022 FIFA World Cup. Milan Borjan represented Canada for whom he played all three group games conceding 7 goals. Strahinja Eraković got called-up by Serbia but failed to achieve any appearance. Finally Osman Bukari represented Ghana with two caps and one goal scorred against Portugal.

December 
On 6 December club announced contract extension with backup goalkeeper Nikola Vasiljević. Vasiljević, who arrived at the club in 2019, spent last three seasons at multiple loans and is still set to make a debut for the club on the officiall match. He signed new contract until summer of 2026.

On 23 December club signed a contract with Serbian international defender Uroš Spajić until summer of 2026. This will be his second spell at the club, after season 2012–13. He arrived at the club as a free agent, after leaving his previous club Kasımpaşa at the end of previous season.

January 
Club will organize mid-season training camp between 8 and 27 January in Turkey during which they will play six friendly games.

On 9 January club announced signing of pre-contract with Nigerian internationall winger Peter Olayinka. Olayinka, who spent last five sesons with the Czech powerhouse Slavia Prague, will be joining the club on 1 July 2023 as a free agent on a three-years-long contract with an option for a fourth year extension.
 
On 16 January club announced departure of Comorian internationall winger Ben who will be joining Cypriot side APOEL on a free transfer. He arrived at the club five years ago from Olympiacos and in that time became one of the best scorrers and foreign players in club's history. During those five seasons he won five Serbian SuperLiga titles and two Serbian Cups, had 196 caps for the club in all competitions and scored 85 goals. Out of those 85 goals 15 were scored in internationall competitions, making him tied at the fifth place of club's top scorers in international competitions.

On 21 January Argentine defender Alex Vigo joined the club on an one year long loan from Argentine side River Plate. Red Star will have an option to buy out his contract.

On 31 January Ivorian midfielder Sékou Sanogo left the club to join French side Paris FC on the loan until the end of the season after which he will become free agent. Sanogo joined the club from the Saudi side Al-Ittihad in January 2020, first on loan and one year later in January 2021 on a permanent transfer. During the three years he spent at the club he had 99 appearances in all competitions, scorred four goals and won three domestic leage titles and two domestic cups.

February 
After the restart of the season following the 2022 FIFA World Cup club played four games during this month drawing first against Vojvodina and winning remaining three. This extended their league unbeaten run to ffourty seven games since 27 October 2021 and secured them top of the table with 13 points ahead of the second placed Partizan.

On 3 February another player left the club on a loan. Serbian midfielder Nemanja Motika moved to an Austrina side Austria Lustenau on a loan until the end of a season. On the same day club brought in new player, also on a loan. Montenegrin striker Marko Rakonjac arrived on a loan until the end of a season from Russian side Lokomotiv Moscow with an option to buy at the end of a season.

On 6 February Serbian defender Radovan Pankov and goalkeeper Zoran Popović left the club for Serbian side Čukarički on a half a season loan. Pankov arrived at the club three and a half seasons ago and had eighty league appearances and 2 goals, while Popović arrived at the club in summer of 2018 and had twenty five league appearances for the club. On same date club announced signing of pre-contract with New Zealand internationall defensive midfielder Marko Stamenic. Stamenic, who spent last three sesons with the Danish side Copenhagen, will be joining the club on 1 July 2023 as a free agent on a four-years-long contract.

On 7 February another player left the club. Ghanian forward Ibrahim Mustapha left the club to join Austrian side LASK for an estimated fee of €500,000. He joined the Red Star youth squad in January 2020. After which he had loan spells at multiple Serbian clubs, and made a debut for Red Star first squad at the start of this season in which he made twelve league appearances.

On 9 February club terminanted contract with Malian internationall forward Kalifa Coulibaly. He arrived at the club at the start of a season, but managed to have just seven appearances and one scorred goal.

Players 

Players and squad numbers last updated on 12 March 2023. Appearances include league matches only.Note: Flags indicate national team as has been defined under FIFA eligibility rules. Players may hold more than one non-FIFA nationality.

 Note: SuperLiga imposes a requirements on under-21 players (marked as U21) and foreign players (marked as FGN). There must be at least one U21 and no more than four FGN players on the pitch at any time.

Pre-season and friendlies

Competitions

Overview

Serbian SuperLiga

Season results summary

Season results round by round

Regular season league table

Regular season matches

Serbian Cup

First round

Round of 16

UEFA Champions League

Third qualifying round

Play off round

UEFA Europa League

Group stage

Squad

Squad statistics 

|-
! colspan=14 style="background:red; color:white; text-align:center;" | Goalkeepers

|-
! colspan=14 style="background:red; color:white; text-align:center;" | Defenders

|-
! colspan=14 style="background:red; color:white; text-align:center;" | Midfielders

|-
! colspan=14 style="background:red; color:white; text-align:center;" | Forwards

|-
! colspan=14 style="background:red; color:white; text-align:center;"| Players transferred out during the season

Goalscorers 

Includes all competitive matches. The list is sorted by shirt number when total goals are equal.

Clean sheets 

Includes all competitive matches. The list is sorted by shirt number when total clean sheets are equal.

Disciplinary record

Transfers

In

Out

Loan returns and promotions

Loan out

See also 
 2022–23 KK Crvena zvezda season

References

Notes 

Red Star Belgrade seasons
Red Star
Red Star